Phrygionis privignaria is a moth in the family Geometridae described by Achille Guenée in 1858. It is distributed over the Caribbean, North, Central and South America.

The MONA or Hodges number for Phrygionis privignaria is 6671.2.

References

Further reading
Arnett, Ross H. (2000). American Insects: A Handbook of the Insects of America North of Mexico. CRC Press.
Lafontaine, J. Donald, & Schmidt, B. Christian (2010). "Annotated check list of the Noctuoidea (Insecta, Lepidoptera) of North America north of Mexico". ZooKeys. vol. 40, 1–239.

External links
Butterflies and Moths of North America

Geometridae